Static War Headquarters Castlegate is a NATO command and communications bunker located approximately 2 km north-east of the town of Linnich, Germany.  SWHQ Castlegate is operated in caretaker status for Allied Joint Force Command Brunssum by a German military contingent.

References

External links
German website with Castlegate information
NATO news
Allied Force Command Brunssum
German website about Castlegate

NATO installations in Germany
Buildings and structures in North Rhine-Westphalia
Bunkers in Germany